You Are Free is a 1983 West German short documentary film directed by Dea Brokman, in which five former U.S. Servicemen and a prison camp survivor provide accounts of the liberation of the Nazi concentration camps in 1945. It was nominated for an Academy Award for Best Documentary Short.

References

External links
 The film on pay-per-view at the Israel Film Archive - Jerusalem Cinematheque
 

1983 documentary films
1983 films
1980s short documentary films
1980s German-language films
German short documentary films
West German films
Documentary films about the Holocaust
1980s German films